The 2005 New Jersey gubernatorial election was a race to determine the Governor of New Jersey. It was held on November 8, 2005. Democratic Governor Richard Codey, who replaced Governor Jim McGreevey in 2004 after his resignation, did not run for election for a full term of office.

The primary election was held on June 7, 2005. U.S. Senator Jon Corzine won the Democratic nomination with no serious opposition. Former West Windsor Mayor Doug Forrester received the Republican nomination with a plurality of 36%. Corzine defeated Forrester in the general election. New Jersey is reliably Democratic at the federal level, but this was the first time since 1977 in which Democrats won more than one consecutive gubernatorial election in the state.

The 2005 general election also saw a public referendum question on the ballot for the voters to decide whether to create a position of lieutenant governor, alter the state's order of succession, and whether the state's first lieutenant governor would be chosen in the subsequent gubernatorial election held in 2009.  The question passed by a tally of 836,134 votes (56.1%) to 655,333 (43.9%). As of 2022, this is the most recent time that Salem County voted for the Democratic candidate in a gubernatorial race.

Democratic primary

Candidates

Nominee
Jon Corzine, U.S. Senator

Eliminated in primary
James D. Kelly Jr., telecommunications company employee
Francis X. Tenaglio, former Pennsylvania State Representative

Declined
Richard Codey, incumbent Governor and president of the New Jersey Senate

Results

Republican primary

Candidates

Nominee
Doug Forrester, former Mayor of West Windsor and nominee for the U.S. Senate in 2002

Eliminated in Primary
Todd Caliguire, Bergen County Freeholder
Paul DiGaetano, State Assemblyman
Steve Lonegan, Mayor of Bogota
John J. Murphy, Morris County Freeholder and former Mayor of Morris Township
Bob Schroeder, Washington Township Councilman
Bret Schundler, former Mayor of Jersey City and nominee for Governor in 2001

Results

General election

Candidates

Major
Jon Corzine (D) Incumbent U.S. Senator
Doug Forrester (R) Former Mayor of West Windsor

Minor
Jeffrey Pawlowski, former Sayreville borough councilman (U.S. Libertarian Party)
Matthew Thieke, computer software analyst and resident of Maple Shade (Green)
Ed Forchion, Candidate for U.S. Representative in New Jersey's 3rd congressional district in 2004 (Marijuana)
Angela Lariscy, Candidate for U.S. Representative in New Jersey's 13th congressional district in 2004 (Socialist Workers)
Constantino Rozzo, Congressional candidate in New Jersey's 2nd congressional district in 2004 (Socialist)
Hector Castillo, physician and candidate for Mayor of Paterson in 2002 (Independent)
Wesley Bell, former mayor of Stafford Township (Independent)
Michael Latigona, registered nurse and EMT from Marlton (Independent)

Debates
The New Jersey Election Law Enforcement Commission declared that the four candidates would be included in the official gubernatorial debates to be aired on NJN. They included Jeffrey Pawlowski and Hector Castillo.
Complete video of debate, September 20, 2005
Complete video of debate, October 18, 2005
Complete video of debate, November 5, 2005

Polling

Results

Results by county

Counties that flipped from Democratic to Republican
Monmouth (largest municipality: Middletown Township)
Ocean (largest municipality: Lakewood)

See also
 Politics of New Jersey

References

External links
New Jersey Department of State - 2005 Election Information Archive

Candidates
Jon Corzine's Official Campaign Site
Doug Forrester's Official Campaign Site
Michael Latigona's Official Campaign Site
Jeff Pawlowski's Official Campaign Site
Constantino Rozzo's Official Campaign Site
Matthew Thieke's Official Campaign Site

Gubernatorial
2005
2005 United States gubernatorial elections